CA Technologies, Inc., formerly Computer Associates International and CA, Inc., was an American multinational software company that developed and published enterprise software. Active from 1976 to 2018, the company was co-founded by Charles B. Wang and Russell Artzt. The pair incorporated CA to capitalize on the emerging market of third-party mainframe software. It grew its portfolio and became successful through acquiring many companies in disparate fields, including system monitoring and management, ID management, security, and anti-virus, among others. In 2018, CA itself was acquired by Broadcom Inc. for nearly US$19 billion in cash.

Acquisitions

Stakes

Divestitures

References

CA Technologies
Mergers and acquisitions